The Netherlands women's national under-21 field hockey team represent the Netherlands in women's international under-21 field hockey and is controlled by the Koninklijke Nederlandse Hockey Bond, the governing body for field hockey in the Netherlands.

The team competes in the EuroHockey Junior Championships which they have won a record ten times. They also have the most Junior World Cup titles with four.

Tournament record

Junior World Cup
 1989 – 4th place
 1993 – 5th place
 1997 – 
 2001 – 4th place
 2005 – 
 2009 – 
 2013 – 
 2016 – 
 2022 – 
 2023 – Qualified

EuroHockey Junior Championship
 1977 – 
 1978 – 
 1979 – 
 1981 – 
 1984 – 
 1988 – 
 1992 – 
 1996 – 
 1998 – 
 2000 – 
 2002 – 
 2004 – 
 2006 – 5th place
 2008 – 
 2010 – 
 2012 – 
 2014 – 
 2017 – 
 2019 – 
 2022 – 

Source:

See also
 Netherlands men's national under-21 field hockey team
 Netherlands women's national field hockey team

References

Under-21
Women's national under-21 field hockey teams
Field hockey